Festival du Monde Arabe de Montréal also known as Festival du Monde Arabe (FMA) (in English Arab World Festival of Montreal, in Arabic مهرجان العالم العربي في مونتريال) is a major annual cultural festival in Montreal, Quebec, Canada dedicated to the arts of the Arab World. It was established in 2000 by Joseph Nakhlé and produced by "Alchimies, Créations et Cultures" and serves to develop a dialogue between Arab and Western cultures.

Diversified in its nature, it covers many forms of arts including dance, music, theater, multidisciplinary arts, visual arts and medias.

Each year a major theme is chosen. Annual themes have included 
2000: Journées 2000
2001: Tentations
2002: Vous avez dit arabe?
2003: Dévoilée
2004: Razzias
2005: Harem
2006: Prophètes rebelles
2007: Espace Zéro
2008: Liaisons andalouses
2009: Mémoires croisées
2010: Arabitudes
2011: Charabia
2012: Utopia
2013: Tribales
2014: 15 folies métèques
2015: Hilarus Delirus
2016: Aurores
2017: Les trois' saisons en quart de ton
2018: Chants de Mutants: Aux rives de Gibraltar
2019: Au midi du monde, 20 ans d'acrobaties
2020: Espace 01: Des univers à conquérir
2021: Entracte

The festival also usually has four auxiliary sections: Arts de la scène, Salon de la culture, Cinéma et La  Médina

External links
FMA official website

Festivals in Montreal
Performing arts in Montreal